Mar Toma Audo, also spelled Thomas Audo (October 10, 1854 - July 27, 1918) was Archbishop of the Chaldean Catholic Archeparchy of Urmia (1890-1918), within the Chaldean Catholic Church.

Life
He was born on October 11, 1855 in Alqosh to ethnic Assyrian parents. His uncle Joseph Audo, who was the Patriarch of the Chaldean Catholic Church, took him to Rome to study. After completing the studies, he was ordained priest in 1880, and appointed the first Archbishop of the newly created Chaldean Catholic Archeparchy of Urmia on December 3, 1890. He was consecrated on September 4, 1892, and served as diocesan bishop until his assassination during the Assyrian genocide on July 27, 1918.

Works
Main work of Toma Audo was a descriptive dictionary of Syriac language, in two volumes, with first being printed in 1897, and second in 1901, but antedated to the same year as the first volume (1897). Entire content of both volumes was printed in Syriac, using the East Syriac script. The work had a Syriac title (Simtā d-leššānā suryāyā), that translates into English as: Treasure of the Syriac Language, but instead of a proper translation of original title, both volumes were printed under an auxiliary French title: Dictionnaire de la langue Chaldêenne. Distinction between Syriac designation in the primary title, and Chaldean designation in the French title, later became on of several points of contention related to that work. 

First edition:
 
 

Later editions:
 
 

Other works:
 Kalila and Dimna: Fables of Bidpai.

See also
 Addai Scher

References

Sources

 
 
 
 
 

1855 births
1918 deaths
Assyrians from the Ottoman Empire
Emigrants from the Ottoman Empire to Iran
Chaldean bishops
People from Alqosh
People who died in the Assyrian genocide
20th-century Eastern Catholic martyrs